Lobnya is a town in Moscow Oblast, Russia, located  north west of Moscow. Population:     30,000 (1970).

History
Lobnya was founded in 1902 and granted town status in 1961.

Krasnaya Polyana in the Battle of Moscow

The German attack starting the Battle of Moscow (code-named ‘Operation Typhoon’) began on October 2 1941. The attack on a broad front brought German forces to occupy the village of Krasnaya Polyana (now in the town of Lobnya) to Moscow's North West. Krasnaya Polyana was taken on November 30 by Erich Hoepner's 4th Panzer Group. This is accepted by many as the closest point occupied by German forces to Moscow. Less accepted is that this is the closest point visited by Germans to Moscow in the campaign.

Many sources state that at least one German army patrol visited nearby Khimki. Among the sources stating the Germans reached Khimki the details of the date and unit involved are inconsistent and disputed. One story of events asserts a skirmish took place in Khimki on October 16 at the Leningradskoye Shosse bridge involving a German motorcycle unit. Another account is a patrol reached Khimki around November 30 or early December before returning to its main unit without combat. The dates mentioned for this second account vary. A myth surrounding this is that the Germans would have been able to see the Kremlin in the distance from Khimki.

The Soviet Army counter offensive for "removing the immediate threat to Moscow" started on December 5 on the North-Western Front (the area around Krasnaya Polyana and Lobnya North West of Moscow). The South-Western Front and Western Fronts began their offensives on December 6. The German forces were driven back. Moscow was never under such close land threat again during the war.

Administrative and municipal status
Within the framework of administrative divisions, it is incorporated as Lobnya Town Under Oblast Jurisdiction—an administrative unit with the status equal to that of the districts. As a municipal division, Lobnya Town Under Oblast Jurisdiction is incorporated as Lobnya Urban Okrug.

Architecture
The palace is Gothic in style, scored to resemble a medieval castle; a flight of stairs connects it with a white-stone wharf by the river, decorated with statues of griffins. To the west from the palace stands the Petrine Baroque church of the Virgin's Nativity (1701–1707). There are also a Gothic bridge, stables, and two English parks with picturesque rotundas.

Within two kilometers from Marfino is the manor of Nikolskoye-Prozorovskoye, which contains a Neo-Baroque country house of Field Marshal Prozorovsky and a Neoclassical church of St. Nicholas, built in the 1790s. Nearby is Rozhdestveno-Suvorovo, where the five-domed church of the Virgin's Nativity was built by Princes Baryatinsky at the turn of the 18th century. In 1773, the estate passed to Alexander Suvorov's father, Vasily Suvorov, a general-in-chief who is buried in the church.

The oldest building in the vicinity is the five-domed four-pillared apseless Trinity Church in Chashnikovo (four kilometers from Lobnya). Its elegant Italianate decor, reminiscent of the Chudov Monastery cathedral, dates the church to the early years of the 16th century, when such Italian architects as Aloisio the New were active in Russia. The church was first documented in 1585, when Chashnikovo was owned by Nikita Romanov, grandfather of Tsar Mikhail I. By the end of the 17th century, the estate had passed to Lev Naryshkin, maternal uncle of Peter the Great, who added a bell tower and had the church's decor updated to answer his own Naryshkin Baroque tastes.

Other well-known villages in the vicinity of Lobnya are Zhostovo (seven kilometers to the northeast) and Fedoskino (ten kilometers to the east), renowned for their traditional folk crafts of Zhostovo painting and Fedoskino miniature, respectively.

People 
 Mikhail Mishustin (b. 1966), Russian politician (Prime Minister of Russia)

References

Notes

Sources

External links
Official website of Lobnya 
Unofficial website of Lobnya 

Cities and towns in Moscow Oblast